The Kingcome Glacier is a glacier located at the head of the Kingcome River in southwestern British Columbia, Canada.

See also
Kingcome (disambiguation)

References

Glaciers of the Pacific Ranges
Central Coast of British Columbia